Sheila Ison Wellstone (August 18, 1944 – October 25, 2002) was an advocate for human rights, the environment, and peace. She was married to U.S. Senator from Minnesota Paul Wellstone. Wellstone focused much of her work on domestic violence, assisting survivors and pursuing policies to support its prevention. She briefly considered running for Governor of Minnesota in the 2002 election, but ultimately chose not to.

While campaigning with her husband in his 2002 re-election campaign, she died in a plane crash along with her husband and daughter Marcia. The Sheila Wellstone Institute continues her commitment to building power and visibility to ensure that ending violence against women and children is a national priority.

References

External links

Sheila Wellstone's Senate Career

1944 births
2002 deaths
Minnesota Democrats
People from Northfield, Minnesota
Women in Minnesota politics
Victims of aviation accidents or incidents in the United States
Accidental deaths in Minnesota
20th-century American politicians
20th-century American women politicians